Dromochorus belfragei, the loamy-ground tiger beetle, is a species of flashy tiger beetle in the family Cicindelidae. It is found in Central America and North America.

References

Further reading

 

Cicindelidae
Articles created by Qbugbot
Beetles described in 1877